Skinhate is a nu metal/hardcore band from Pokrov, Ukraine.

History 
In fact, the history of the band began in the summer of 1994, when Oleksandr Kukhtin, Oleksandr Stepanenko, Andriy Diadiura, Vitaliy Kuznetsov and Oleksandr Yefymenko, changing the names ("Nekropedofil", "Godless", "Virgin Cunt") began to give concerts in small towns of Ukraine. In this period it was created a number of songs that have become mega hit in the era immediately "SkinHate".

In 1998, the band took the name "Hate", which was later changed to "SkinHate".

The first concert took place in Kyiv in 1999. By this time the group has managed to record their own album called "Skinhate", after rewriting Moon Records called "War in heads". The album is dedicated to the memory of one of Andriy 'Yuryk' Diadiura, one of band founders who was killed in 2000.

In 2002 SkinHate recorded the second album – "Ticket to paradise."

In 2006 the band released their 3rd album "All around".

Members
Active members
 Dmytro Kustikov 'Kust' (Дмитро Кустіков 'Куст') – vocal
 Oleksandr Stepanenko 'Stepan' (Олександр Степаненко 'Степан') – guitar
 Vitaliy Kuznetsov 'Kuzma' (Віталій Кузнецов 'Кузьма') – bass guitar
 Oleksandr Kukhtin 'KyxXxtyA' (Олександр Кухтін 'КухХхтЯ') – drums

Former members
 Andriy Diadiura 'Yuryk' (Андрій Дядюра 'Юрик') – vocal, guitar (1999–2001)
 Yevhen Lashko 'Zh.K.' (Євген Лашко 'Ж. К.') – vocal (1999–2006; 2008–2009)
 Serhiy Maryshev 'Banan' (Сергій Маришев 'Банан') – bass guitar (2004–2008)
 Oleksa Fisiuk (Олекса Фісюк) – bass guitar (2008–2010)
 Anton Yelisin 'Kalyna' (Антон Єлісін 'Калина') – bass guitar (2000–2002)
 Oleksandr Yefymenko 'Yefym' (Олександр Єфименко 'Єфим') – vocal

Discography
Studio albums
 2001 – Війна в головах (Viyna v holovakh, War in heads)
 2002 – Квиток до раю (Kvytok do raiu, Ticket to paradise)
 2003 – Війна в головах + bonus (Viyna v holovakh + bonus, War in heads + bonus; re-released)
 2004 – Hatemix 
 2006 – Навкруги (Navkruhy, All around)
 2016 – НеЯкУсі (NeYakUsi, Not like everyone else)

Singles
 2010 – ZDATEN (Able)
 2011 – Bull-Dozer
 2011 – Грань (Hran, Edge)
 2015 – Як усі (YakUsi, Like everyone else)

Videography
 "Грань" / "Hran" 
 "32"

Interesting facts 
 Despite the name, guys have no relation to the movement of skinheads and neo-Nazis, but such name has become an obstacle to the publication of their albums in Russia.
 Skinhate's musical style was influenced by such bands: Slayer, Korn, Sepultura, Slipknot, Soulfly, Biohazard, Machine Head and more.

Nu metal musical groups
Ukrainian rock music groups
Musical groups established in 1999
1999 establishments in Ukraine